The 2017–18 LEN Euro Cup was the second tier of European competition in water polo. It ran from 27 September 2017 to 18 April 2018.

Overview

Team allocation

Phases and rounds dates
The schedule of the competition is as follows.

Qualifying rounds

Qualification round I

Group A

Group B

Qualification round II

Group C

Group D

Knockout stage

Bracket

Quarter-finals

|}

Semi-finals

|}

Final

|}

See also
2017–18 LEN Champions League

References

External links

LEN Euro Cup seasons
Euro Cup
2017 in water polo
2018 in water polo